Chuck Phelps may refer to:
 Chuck Phelps (pastor), former American pastor
Chuck Phelps (drummer), American drummer